Grove Township is a township in Davis County, Iowa, USA.  As of the 2000 census, its population was 245.

History
Grove Township was organized in 1846.

Geography
Grove Township covers an area of 40.67 square miles (105.34 square kilometers); of this, 0.08 square miles (0.21 square kilometers) or 0.2 percent is water.

Unincorporated towns
 Stiles
(This list is based on USGS data and may include former settlements.)

Adjacent townships
 Prairie Township (east)
 Roscoe Township (east)
 Wyacondah Township (west)
 Cleveland Township (northwest)

Cemeteries
The township contains seven cemeteries: Collins, French, Lister, Patterson, Rader, Stiles and Union.

References
 U.S. Board on Geographic Names (GNIS)
 United States Census Bureau cartographic boundary files

External links
 US-Counties.com
 City-Data.com

Townships in Davis County, Iowa
Townships in Iowa